Johnathan Bandavious Atkins (born December 21, 1992) is an American football nose tackle for the Memphis Showboats of the United States Football League (USFL). He played college football at Georgia, and has been a member of the New England Patriots, Detroit Lions, and Atlanta Falcons.

College career
Atkins spent five seasons as a member of Georgia Bulldogs, redshirting his freshman year. During his redshirt senior season, Atkins made 38 tackles, including one for a loss, as the Bulldogs' starting nose tackle. He finished his collegiate career with 81 total tackles, 3.5 for loss, five pass deflections and a fumble recovery in 48 games played.

Professional career

New England Patriots
Atkins signed with the New England Patriots as an undrafted free agent on April 29, 2018. Considered a long shot to make the team, Atkins was cut by the Patriots at the end of training camp on September 1, 2018.

Detroit Lions
Atkins was signed to the Detroit Lions' practice squad on September 3, 2018. Atkins was waived by the team on November 30, 2018 but subsequently re-signed to the practice squad. Aktins was promoted to the Lions' Active roster on December 18, 2018 after defensive tackle Da'Shawn Hand was placed on injured reserve. Atkins made his NFL debut on December 23, 2018 in a 27–9 loss to the Minnesota Vikings, making two tackles (one for loss).

On August 31, 2019, Atkins was waived by the Lions as part of final roster cuts, but was signed to the team's practice squad the next day. He was promoted to the active roster on October 14. Atkins played in 12 games during the 2019 season, including six starts, and made 20 tackles.

On July 29, 2020, Atkins announced he was opting out of the 2020 season due to the COVID-19 pandemic. He was waived after the season on June 2, 2021.

Atlanta Falcons
On June 17, 2021, Atkins signed with the Atlanta Falcons. He was waived on August 14.

Tampa Bay Bandits
On February 23, 2022, Atkins was drafted in the 2022 USFL Draft by the Tampa Bay Bandits.

Memphis Showboats
Atkins and all other Tampa Bay Bandits players were all transferred to the Memphis Showboats after it was announced that the Bandits were taking a hiatus and that the Showboats were joining the league.

References

External links
Georgia Bulldogs bio
Detroit Lions bio
College statistics at Sports-Reference.com

1992 births
Living people
People from Thomson, Georgia
Players of American football from Georgia (U.S. state)
American football defensive tackles
American football defensive ends
Georgia Bulldogs football players
Under Armour All-American football players
New England Patriots players
Detroit Lions players
Atlanta Falcons players
Tampa Bay Bandits (2022) players